Pulchrocladia retipora, most commonly known as the coral lichen, is a species of fruticose lichen in the family Cladoniaceae. It occurs in Australasia and New Caledonia where it grows in coastal and alpine heathlands. The lichen features coral-like branches and subbranches with numerous netlike perforations. It is known by multiple names, with some sources referring to it by its synonym Cladia retipora, or the common name lace lichen.

The lichen was first scientifically collected by Jacques Labillardière on board the Bruni d'Entrecasteaux expeditions in 1792. Labillardière had erroneously classified it as an alga rather than a lichen. Pulchrocladia retipora was the first Australian lichen to be described in a scientific publication.

Taxonomy

The species was first formally described by Jacques Labillardière in 1806, as Baeomyces reteporus. The type specimen was collected from Tasmania. This collection was made as part of the botanical collections he made during his 1791 voyage to the South Seas with French explorer Antoine Bruni d'Entrecasteaux in an unsuccessful search for Jean-François de Galaup, comte de Lapérouse. He had first collected the lichen in 1792, and published the description in Novae Hollandiae Plantarum Specimen, erroneously describing the lichen as an alga. According to Rex Filson, the lichen is the first that was described for Australia.

In its taxonomic history, the taxon has been shuffled to several genera, some of which are no longer used or have been synonymized with other genera. These include Cenomyce (Acharius, 1814), Pycnothelia (Fée, 1825), Cladonia (Fries, 1826), Cladina (Nylander, 1868), Cladia (Nylander, 1876), and Clathrina (Johann Müller, 1883). It is now the type species of genus Pulchrocladia, which was circumscribed in 2018 by Soili Stenroos, Raquel Pino-Bodas, Helge Thorsten Lumbsch, and Teuvo Ahti following a large-scale molecular phylogenetic analysis of the family Cladoniaceae.

It is commonly known as the coral lichen, or the lace lichen.

Description

Like most species in the family Cladoniaceae, Pulchrocladia retipora has a  growth form, meaning it has both a primary (horizontal) and secondary (vertical) thallus. The primary thallus is nodular (i.e. with small raised areas or swellings) and white, and only lasts for a short period.  are the secondary thallus that originate from the primary thallus. They are rigid when dry, but become spongy when wet. They are irregularly or dichotomously branched, forming cushiony clumps. The wall is highly perforated (about 5–11 perforations per centimetre), with large, round to ellipsoidal holes. The surface of the podetium is continuously  and lacks soredia. The inner medulla is made of twisted strands of hyphae with a cobweb-like form.

Apothecia occur infrequently. When present, they are small, black, and crowd together at the ends of small, terminal branches (branchlets). The colour of the hymenium ranges from dark reddish-brown to black. Ascospores have dimensions of 25–27 by 5 μm. The conidiomata are terminal on branchlets, and covered with translucent slime; they produce curved or straight conidia measuring 6 by 1 μm. Specimens collected in Australia tend to have a brownish tinge, while New Zealand specimens range from pure white to grey, to grayish-green, or slightly yellowish. The photobiont partner is green algae from the Trebouxia. Occasionally, free-living algae become trapped in the irregularly intertwined hyphae of the medulla.

Usnic acid and atranorin are the major secondary compounds present in Pulchrocladia retipora. Other compounds occurring in lesser quantity, and detectable using thin-layer chromatography, include protolichesterinic and ursolic acids, and, often also rangiformic acid and norrangiformic acids. It is usnic acid that is thought to be responsible for the antimicrobial, antiviral and cytotoxic biological activity of Pulchrocladia retipora lichen extracts tested in in vitro experiments.

William Martin remarked finding square metre-sized cushions in the area of Lewis Pass in Canterbury, New Zealand. A separate description describes cushions the size of a football in Australia's Grampians National Park. According to Martin, coral lichen forming massive cushion growths only occur in subalpine zones, with lowland forms being only  in size.

Habitat and distribution

Pulchrocladia retipora is widely distributed in Australasia. In Australia, it has been recorded from the Australian Capital Territory, New South Wales, Queensland, Victoria, and Tasmania. In New Zealand, it is known from both the North and South Islands as well as Antipodes Island, Auckland Islands, Campbell Island, and Chatham Islands. In the Pacific, it occurs in New Caledonia.

The coral lichen is particularly common in subalpine peat bogs, it is often found in association with the lichens Cladonia confusa, Rexiella sullivani, and Stereocaulon ramulosum. It is found on peaty soils, found among tussocks or in heaths comprising Dracophyllum and Leptospermum, at the margins of Nothofagus forests, in fellfield, or rarely on surfaces such as rocks, logs, and sand dunes. In the moorlands of the Meredith Range area in Tasmania, it is found in "better drained, elevated sites, such as near rotting, dead buttongrass hummocks."

The lichen replicates vegetatively when new podetia grow from fragments of old podetia. It has highly variable growth rates, ranging from less than 1 mm per year to up to a few centimetres per year. It has been noted to grow in clusters, sometimes up a metre in diameter. The unique morphology of the lichen helps it to survive the exposed heaths it inhabits, as the coral structure increases gas exchange, moderates temperature extremes, and maximises light and water access.

Uses and research
The complex net-like structures of Pulchrocladia retipora are known as fenestrations. The appearance of the lichen has been described as "of considerable beauty resembling lace or coral". As a result, it has been used in floral decoration and architectural design.

Thallus development
The development and growth dynamics of the branching pattern of Pulchrocladia retipora has been studied. The first structure to emerge from the primary thallus is a meristem, a solid bundle of tissue comprising only fungal cells. Two adjacent meristem bundles give rise to the erect secondary thallus, the podetium. These bundles continue to split dichotomously, resulting in groups of three meristem bundles. Because the development of same-age bundles is unequal, the developmental differences become more pronounced as the meristem bundles grow farther apart. Splitting of the meristem is not synchronized between approximately same-age bundles; consequently, one meristem bundle or one side of the podetium grows beyond the others. Slight bends and twists of the meristem during early development are later made apparent by the relative angles of the meristem bundles with respect to each other. Perforations that are developmentally unrelated to the central perforation tend to occur early in the lichenised tissue distal to the meristem, while perforations that occur between meristem bundles happen later in development.

Resynthesis
The Pulchrocladia retipora lichen thallus has been successfully resynthesized from isolated mycobiont and photobiont under laboratory conditions. In these experiments, lichen primordia, consisting of fungal mycelia and enclosed algae, appear after about one month. After four months, the cultures form minute scales that are the starting units for the development of the complex hyphal network that becomes the thallus. Later, the scales differentiate into columns that grow together vertically to form a thin network, and more hyphae join and fuse together to strengthen and stabilize the network. Eventually, algae colonise the network prior to further development of the inner medulla and connecting of the fenestrations. In the laboratory, the entire process takes about two years.

Biomonitoring

The  Baseline Air Pollution Station in Tasmania (part of the World Meteorological Organization-Global Atmosphere Watch network) has used Pulchrocladia retipora as a bioindicator to identify how atmospheric nitrogen and sulphur deposition in Tasmania is affected by human pollution.

References

External links
Herbarium records of Pulchrocladia retipora at the Consortium of North American Lichen Herbaria

Cladoniaceae
Lichen species
Lichens described in 1806
Lichens of Australia
Lichens of New Caledonia
Lichens of New Zealand
Taxa named by Jacques Labillardière